The 2009 Air New Zealand Cup will be the Auckland's 4th consecutive participation in the competition. They are coming off a 2008 placing of 11th which include 5 wins, 5 losses and 22 competition points scored.

Mark Anscombe will coach Auckland for the first time after coming down from Northland and will be assisted by Andrew Strawbridge.
A total of 26 players were selected to compete for the Air New Zealand Cup, with 14 forwards and 12 backs. 

Auckland are currently sitting last on the 2009 Air New Zealand Cup standings after two rounds of play. A 47–13 loss to Hawke's Bay in the first round and a 22–16 loss at the hands of rivals Canterbury. They have scored 29 points but given up 69 with a total of 1 competition point.

Squad
Squad for the 2009 Air New Zealand Cup:

Fixtures
Auckland have play 5 of a total of 16 games in 2009, not including playoff appearances, 3 pre-season games and 13 round-robin games. During the round-robin they will play 6 home games and 7 away games.

Pre-season
Auckland's pre-season matches were a success with 3 wins out of 3, first beating Counties Manukau, 14–0 on 11 July, then gaining victory over Waikato 17 points to 12 on 17 July and finally climbing over North Harbour 17–6 on 23 July.

References

2009 Air New Zealand Cup